Henrica Petronella Johanna Maria van den Heuvel (-van Dijck) (born 12 June 1966 in Helmond, North Brabant), known as Erica van Dijck, is a retired female badminton player from the Netherlands. She won the silver medal in mixed doubles at the 1988 European Badminton Championships, with partner Alex Meijer.

She also competed at three Summer Olympic Games, in 1992, 1996, and 2000.

References

External links
 
 
 
 

1966 births
Living people
Dutch female badminton players
Olympic badminton players of the Netherlands
Badminton players at the 1992 Summer Olympics
Badminton players at the 1996 Summer Olympics
Badminton players at the 2000 Summer Olympics
Sportspeople from Helmond